Eternal Poison, released in Japan as , is a turn-based tactical role-playing game developed mainly by Flight-Plan, published and produced by Banpresto for the PlayStation 2. The game is a dark fantasy RPG where the player must catch and collect demons called Majin, these monsters can then be used as fellow party members or taken back to the base for other customizations.

Plot
Eternal Poison begins in the Kingdom of Valdia where the demonic realm of Besek has suddenly appeared. This realm is home to demons called the Majin who have captured Valdia's Princess. The King of Valdia then issues a decree for her rescue which brings upon numerous adventurers of dissimilar intentions, the story of game is told from multiple perspectives of five key parties as they journey their way through the realm of Besek to rescue the princess.

Release

The game was released November 11, 2008 in North America by Atlus as a two-disc set, which includes a soundtrack CD featuring selected tracks.

Reception

Eternal Poison received "mixed" reviews according to the review aggregation website Metacritic.  In Japan, Famitsu gave it a score of two eights and two sevens for a total of 30 out of 40.

IGN criticized its confusing menus, long loading times during battle animations, and its repetitive soundtrack, while Destructoid praised the looks and the engaging story.  1UP.com called it "a darkly beautiful, but very flawed, gothic/noir strategy-RPG."

References

External links
 
  
 

2008 video games
Banpresto games
Dark fantasy video games
Fantasy video games
Flight-Plan games
PlayStation 2 games
PlayStation 2-only games
Single-player video games
Tactical role-playing video games
Video games developed in Japan
Video games featuring female protagonists